Mary Elizabeth McDonough (born May 4, 1961), sometimes credited as Mary Beth McDonough, is an American actress and writer, best known for her role as Erin Walton on The Waltons from 1972 to 1981.

Early life
McDonough was born May 4, 1961 in the Van Nuys section of Los Angeles, California, the third of four children to Lawrence and Elizabeth (née Murray) McDonough. Her father was an Irish American ex-marine from Nebraska, while her mother was from La Junta, Colorado. McDonough was raised Catholic, in what she described as a working-class family. She and her siblings were raised in Northridge, and attended Our Lady of Lourdes School in Los Angeles. McDonough was an active theater student, and became interested in acting in elementary school.

Career

McDonough began her career as a child actor, portraying Erin Walton in the series The Waltons beginning in 1972, a role which she would portray until the series' finale in 1981. She made her feature film debut with a minor part in the action film Lovely But Deadly (1981) before co-starring with Melissa Sue Anderson in the television horror film Midnight Offerings (1981). McDonough was subsequently cast in a lead role in the slasher film Mortuary (1983), opposite Lynda Day George and Bill Paxton.  She later reprised her role of Erin Walton in the Waltons television reunion films A Wedding on Walton's Mountain, Mother's Day on Walton's Mountain, and A Day for Thanks on Walton's Mountain (all released in 1982). In 1987, she had a lead role in the dark comedy Funland, about an unhinged amusement park operator.

In the 1990s, McDonough appeared as Erin Walton in a further three Waltons films: A Walton Thanksgiving Reunion (1993), A Walton Wedding (1995), and A Walton Easter (1997).

In the 2000s, she returned to television acting, guest-starring on Boston Legal and The New Adventures of Old Christine (2006–2009). McDonough was a radio guest and has been on international and syndicated shows such as Get Focused Radio with Kate Hennessy. She can be seen on the internet in the show McDougall M.D. as part of the broadcasts on the TBN network.

In 2018, McDonough's book Christmas on Honeysuckle Lane was adapted into the Hallmark Channel film of the same name starring Alicia Witt and Colin Ferguson. McDonough appeared in the film in a minor supporting role.

Personal life
McDonough suffers from lupus erythematosus, which she claimed on her In the Know plastic surgery awareness website stemmed from leaking silicone from her breast implants.

Filmography

Film

Television

Other work

References

Sources

Further reading

External links

 McDonough's official site
 The Mary McDonough Fan Club (bilingual)
 

1961 births
Living people
Actresses from Los Angeles
American child actresses
American film actresses
American people of Irish descent
American television actresses
Catholics from California
People with lupus
People from Van Nuys, Los Angeles
Writers from Los Angeles
20th-century American actresses
21st-century American actresses
The Waltons